Juraj Dudáš (born 10 September 1963) is a Slovak weightlifter. He competed in the men's heavyweight I event at the 1988 Summer Olympics.

References

1963 births
Living people
Slovak male weightlifters
Olympic weightlifters of Czechoslovakia
Weightlifters at the 1988 Summer Olympics
Sportspeople from Komárno